The John Hunt Morgan Memorial in Lexington, Kentucky, is a monument created during the Jim Crow era, as a tribute to Confederate General John Hunt Morgan, who was from Lexington and is buried in Lexington Cemetery. The monument was originally situated on the Courthouse Lawn at the junction of North Upper and East Main Street, but was moved to Lexington Cemetery in 2018.

With the help of the state government of Kentucky, the United Daughters of the Confederacy erected the monument on October 18, 1911 on what was then the courthouse lawn.  The bronze statue was cast in Brooklyn, New York, at a cost of $15,000. The state of Kentucky contributed $7,500 of the cost because the UDC was unable to raise all of the funds promised.  The ceremony included a parade of 400 veterans.  The pedestal is of granite.  The monument was dedicated by Morgan's brother-in-law Basil W. Duke, master of ceremonies, and keynote speaker Dr. Guy Carleton Lee, a third cousin of Robert E. Lee.  Also in attendance were John Castleman, and Morgan's brothers Charlton and Dick. At the ceremony, the Rev. Edward O. Guerrant, who had served with General Morgan, gave the prayer of dedication, saying:

Of the monuments of the American Civil War in Kentucky, it is the only one with a soldier on horseback.

Morgan's horse, Black Bess, was a mare, but sculptor Pompeo Coppini thought a stallion was more appropriate.  Coppini said, "No hero should bestride a mare!".  Therefore, Coppini added the necessary testicles.  Undergraduates from nearby University of Kentucky have been known to paint the testicles of the horse in the school colors of blue and white.  An anonymous author wrote the "Ballad of Black Bess", which ended with:

The memorial was one of 60 different Civil War properties in Kentucky placed on the National Register of Historic Places on the same day, July 17, 1997.  Three other properties listed that day are also located in Lexington: the John C. Breckinridge Memorial, which is on the other side of the same block as the Morgan Memorial, and the Confederate Soldier Monument in Lexington and the Ladies' Confederate Memorial, both in nearby Lexington Cemetery.

Removal from original site 
In November 2015, a committee, the Urban County Arts Review Board, voted to recommend removal of the Morgan and Breckinridge memorials. After receiving pressure from local grassroots organizing, Mayor Jim Gray re-announced plans to relocate the memorial to Veterans Park in south Lexington. The monuments were removed October 17, 2017. By July 2018, both the Morgan and Breckinridge memorials had been relocated to Lexington Cemetery, where both men are buried.

See also

 Hunt-Morgan House
 Lexington in the American Civil War

References

1911 establishments in Kentucky
1911 sculptures
Bronze sculptures in Kentucky
Civil War Monuments of Kentucky MPS
Equestrian statues in Kentucky
Lexington in the American Civil War
National Register of Historic Places in Lexington, Kentucky
Outdoor sculptures in Kentucky
Sculptures by Pompeo Coppini
Sculptures of men in Kentucky
Relocated buildings and structures in Kentucky
United Daughters of the Confederacy monuments and memorials in Kentucky